Amanitaraqide was a king of Kingdom of Kush of Meroë in ca. 40–50.

A Nubian ornamental bracelet from the period of Amanitaraqide's reign is on display at the Museum of Fine Arts, Boston.

References 

1st-century monarchs of Kush
Kings of Kush